Nikolai Nikolayevich Sergiyenko (born 30 September 1978) is an Uzbekistani professional football player. He last played in the Russian Second Division for FC Chelyabinsk. He also holds Russian citizenship.

External links
 
 Career summary by KLISF

1978 births
Living people
People from Bukhara Region
Uzbekistani footballers
Uzbekistani expatriate footballers
Uzbekistan international footballers
FC Shinnik Yaroslavl players
FC Sibir Novosibirsk players
Expatriate footballers in Russia
Uzbekistani expatriate sportspeople in Russia
Buxoro FK players
Association football midfielders
FC Khimik Dzerzhinsk players
FC Novokuznetsk players
FC Amur Blagoveshchensk players